

Ealdwulf (died  815) was a medieval Bishop of Lichfield.

Ealdwulf was consecrated between 799 and 801 and died between 814 and 816. The historian D. P. Kirby speculates that the last act of his predecessor, Hygeberht, was to consecrate Ealdwulf, before Hygeberht resigned his archbishopric of Lichfield.

Notes

Citations

References

External links
 

810s deaths
9th-century English bishops
8th-century births
Anglo-Saxon bishops of Lichfield